Leucocercops is a genus of moths in the family Gracillariidae.

Species
Leucocercops dasmophora (Meyrick, 1908)

External links
Global Taxonomic Database of Gracillariidae (Lepidoptera)

Acrocercopinae
Gracillarioidea genera